Riccardo Sogliano (born 4 March 1942 in Alessandria) is a retired Italian professional footballer who played as a midfielder.

Playing career
Sogliano played for 7 seasons (144 games, 6 goals) in the Italian Serie A for Varese F.C. and A.C. Milan.

After retirement
From 2004 to 2008, Sogliano was the owner of A.S. Varese 1910. In 2015, he was charged with tax fraud.

Personal life
Riccardo's son Sean Sogliano played in Serie A for several seasons.

Honours
Milan
 Coppa Italia winner: 1971–72, 1972–73.
 UEFA Cup Winners' Cup winner: 1972–73.

References

1942 births
Living people
Italian footballers
Serie A players
A.C.N. Siena 1904 players
U.S. Alessandria Calcio 1912 players
S.S.D. Varese Calcio players
A.C. Milan players

Association football midfielders
U.S.D. Novese players
A.S.D. La Biellese players